Decimiana bolivari is a species of praying mantis in the family Acanthopidae. It is native to South America.

See also
List of mantis genera and species

References

Acanthopidae
Mantodea of South America
Fauna of Bolivia
Insects described in 1916
Insects of South America